Aba Khel is a town in the Federally Administered Tribal Areas of Pakistan. It is located at 33°11'47N 70°22'38E with an altitude of 757 metres (2486 feet).

See also
 Adin Shah Kot
 Abak, Khyber Pakhtunkhwa
 Abbas Khel Raghzai

References

Populated places in Khyber Pakhtunkhwa